Boston Borough Council in Lincolnshire, England is elected every four years. Since the last boundary changes in 2015, 30 councillors are elected from 15 wards.

Political control
The first election to the council was held in 1973, initially operating as a shadow authority before coming into its powers on 1 April 1974. Political control of the council since 1973 has been held by the following parties:

Leadership
The leaders of the council since 2006 have been:

Council elections
1973 Boston Borough Council election
1976 Boston Borough Council election
1979 Boston Borough Council election (New ward boundaries)
1983 Boston Borough Council election
1987 Boston Borough Council election
1991 Boston Borough Council election
1995 Boston Borough Council election
1999 Boston Borough Council election (New ward boundaries reduced the number of seats by two)
2003 Boston Borough Council election
2007 Boston Borough Council election
2011 Boston Borough Council election
2015 Boston Borough Council election (New ward boundaries reduced the number of seats by two)
2019 Boston Borough Council election

Borough result maps

By-election results

1995-1999

1999-2003

2003-2007

2007-2011

2011-2015

References

By-election results

External links
Boston Borough Council

 
Council elections in Lincolnshire
Borough of Boston
District council elections in England